One Atmosphere is an album composed entirely by Texas-born saxophonist Julius Hemphill. Tzadik Records released the album in August 2003. It is considered experimental and avant-garde.

Track listing
 "One Atmosphere" - 9:01
 "Savannah Suite" - 8:20
 "Water Music for Woodwinds: Mr. Neptune" - 9:13
 "Water Music for Woodwinds: Miss Catherine" - 7:31
 "Water Music for Woodwinds: King's Pawn" - 7:40
 "Water Music for Woodwinds: Backwater" - 9:17

Personnel
Although composed by Hemphill, the music was performed by various musicians, as Hemphill died in 1995.

 Pheeroan akLaff - drums, percussion
 Tim Berne - alto and baritone saxophones
 Robert DeBellis - tenor saxophone, flute, clarinet
 Marty Ehrlich - soprano and alto saxophones, flute
 Erik Friedlander - cello
 Sam Furnace - soprano and alto saxophones, flute
 Oliver Lake - soprano and alto saxophones, flute
 Ursula Oppens - piano
 J. D. Parran - baritone saxophone, flute, clarinet
 Aaron Stewart - tenor saxophone, flute
 Pacific String Quartet

References

External links 
 Catalog Entry @ Tzadik

2003 albums
Julius Hemphill albums
Tzadik Records albums